Alexander Vladimirovich Kasjanov (born 30 September 1983) is a Russian bobsledder who has competed since 2006. He has competed at the 2014 Winter Olympics, where he got 4th place in two-man and four-men event. On November 29, 2017, he was disqualified for doping and received a life-time ban from the Olympics.

World Cup Podiums

References

External links
 
 
 

1983 births
Bobsledders at the 2014 Winter Olympics
Living people
Olympic bobsledders of Russia
Russian male bobsledders
People from Bratsk
Russian sportspeople in doping cases
Doping cases in bobsleigh
Sportspeople from Irkutsk Oblast